The National Museum of the Marine Corps is the historical museum of the United States Marine Corps. Located in Triangle, Virginia near MCB Quantico, the museum opened on November 10, 2006, and is now one of the top tourist attractions in the state, drawing over 500,000 people annually.

In July 2013, the museum announced plans for a major expansion, to include sections on more modern Marine Corps history, such as the 1983 Beirut barracks bombing, a combat art gallery, and a Global War on Terrorism gallery.

Background

The museum replaces both the Marine Corps Historical Center in the Washington Navy Yard, which closed on July 1, 2005, and the Marine Corps Air-Ground Museum in Quantico, Virginia, which closed on November 15, 2002.

A public-private venture, the museum is a cooperative effort between the United States Marine Corps and the Marine Corps Heritage Foundation. The Foundation manages the museum operation, while the museum building will be donated to the Marine Corps.

Designed by Curtis W. Fentress of Fentress Architects, the museum's exterior is meant to "evoke the image of the flag raisers of Iwo Jima," an image that is also preserved by the Marine Corps War Memorial. A replica of the "Iron Mike" statue at Marine Corps Base Quantico stands on the lawn, to one side of the main entrance.

Marine Corps Heritage Foundation
Established in 1979, the Marine Corps Heritage Foundation is a private, non-profit organization that supports the historical programs of the Marine Corps. In 1999, the Foundation expanded its mission to include the creation of the National Museum of the Marine Corps.

Heritage Center
The National Museum of the Marine Corps is designed to be the centerpiece of a complex of facilities called the Marine Corps Heritage Center. This multi-use,  campus includes the Semper Fidelis Memorial Park and Semper Fidelis Chapel; a demonstration area with parade grounds; hiking trails and other outdoor recreational offerings; a conference center and hotel; and an archive facility to restore and preserve Marine artifacts.

The chapel, designed by Fentress Architects, was completed in 2009 with a $5 million donation from a retired Marine.

Exhibits

The museum features the following permanent exhibits, which were designed by Christopher Chadbourne and Associates:
 Leatherneck Gallery 
 Legacy Walk
 Making Marines
 World War II
 Korean War
 Vietnam War
On June 5, 2010, the following three exhibits were opened:
 Defending a New Nation (1775–1865)
 Age of Expansion (1866–1916)
 World War I (1917–1918)

It also has a statue of a horse, Sergeant Reckless, which served with the Marine Corps in Korea. The statue was dedicated on Friday, 26 July 2013.

The museum also includes classrooms, a theater, a gift shop, a bar, a restaurant, and a rifle range laser simulator. The Korean War gallery features a section that simulates the cold temperature and sounds of the Battle of the Chosin Reservoir in 1951, while the war's fighting was at its peak. Two play areas for children can also be found within the museum.

See also

 History of the United States Marine Corps
 List of maritime museums in the United States
 :Category:Marine Corps museums in the United States
 National Museum of the United States Navy
 National Museum of the United States Air Force
 National Museum of the United States Army
 War in the Pacific National Historical Park

References

External links

 
 Marine Corps Heritage Foundation website
 National Museum of the Marine Corps, Fentress Architects (Retrieved 2006-06-25). General and "green" design features of the Museum.
 National Museum of the Marine Corps, Christopher Chadbourne and Associates, Inc. (Exhibit Design)
 National Museum of the Marine Corps, Moh.Visuals, Inc. (Tun Tavern Design)
 Photo Gallery

Marine Corps museums in the United States
Military and war museums in Virginia
Maritime museums in Virginia
Museums in Prince William County, Virginia
Museums established in 2006
2006 establishments in Virginia